This is a list of programmes produced and broadcast on Sanlih E-Television, a television channel in Taiwan. Dramas broadcast but not produced by the channel are excluded from the list.

SET Taiwan

Daily 8pm dramas

Friday

SET Metro

Sunday idol dramas
Most of the Sunday idol dramas are broadcast first on TTV.

Friday idol dramas
All of the Friday idol dramas are TTV co-productions with SET idol dramas. 

1The finales were shortened to 30–45 minutes for the above dramas.

Daily 8pm dramas
Most of the 8pm Idol dramas are broadcast first on SET Metro.

Friday dramas
All of the Friday idol dramas are TTV/SET Metro co-productions with SET idol dramas. 

Sanlih E-Television
Dramas Broadcast By Sanlih E-Television